Progress 40 was a Soviet unmanned Progress cargo spacecraft, which was launched in February 1989 to resupply the Mir EO-4 expedition aboard the Mir space station.

Launch
Progress 40 launched on 10 February 1989 from the Baikonur Cosmodrome in the Kazakh SSR. It used a Soyuz-U2 rocket.

Docking
Progress 40 docked with the aft port of the Kvant-1 module of Mir on 12 February 1989 at 10:29:38 UTC, and was undocked on 3 March 1989 at 01:45:52 UTC.

Decay
It remained in orbit until 5 March 1989, when it was deorbited. The deorbit burn occurred at 01:08 UTC and the mission ended at 01:59 UTC.

See also

 1989 in spaceflight
 List of Progress missions
 List of uncrewed spaceflights to Mir

References

Progress (spacecraft) missions
1989 in the Soviet Union
Spacecraft launched in 1989
Spacecraft which reentered in 1989
Spacecraft launched by Soyuz-U rockets